Wesley Alan Meredith (born December 22, 1963) is a former Republican senator in the North Carolina General Assembly in the state's nineteenth Senatorial district. In 2018 he lost the election to Democrat Kirk DeViere. The 19th district is made up of Cumberland County.

Meredith was born in Tupelo, Mississippi, and moved to Fort Bragg, North Carolina, where he served in the 307th Engineer Battalion of the 82 Airborne Division. He left the military after nearly three years of service with an Honorable Discharge rank of Sergeant having received the Army Service Ribbon, the Army Achievement Medal with 2 Oak Leaf Clusters, and the NCO Professional Development Ribbon.

Prior to becoming a state senator in 2011, Meredith served on the Fayetteville City Council for three terms spanning from 2005 to 2010. From 2007 to 2009, Meredith held the position of Mayor Pro Tempore.

Meredith served on the following Senate standing committees:  Appropriations on Department of Transportation (co-chair), Commerce (co-chair), Agriculture/Environment/Natural Resources, Transportation, and Rules and Operations of the Senate.

Electoral history

References

External links

Living people
Republican Party North Carolina state senators
1963 births
21st-century American politicians
People from Tupelo, Mississippi
People from Fort Bragg, North Carolina
People from Fayetteville, North Carolina